Phi (stylized as Φ) is the tenth studio album of the Japanese duo KinKi Kids. It is the first album by KinKi Kids to have a Greek-lettered title, rather than the traditional Latin-lettered album title. The album was certified platinum by the RIAJ for 250,000 copies shipped to stores in Japan.

Track listing

Charts

References

External links
 Official Phi album information

2007 albums
KinKi Kids albums